Christian of the Palatinate-Zweibrücken may refer to:
 Christian of the Palatinate-Zweibrücken (1752–1817), Bavarian General of the Infantry
 Christian of the Palatinate-Zweibrücken (1782–1859), Bavarian General of the Cavalry